The following is a list of the year-by-year results of the Sunflower Showdown basketball rivalry between the University of Kansas and Kansas State University.

Kansas victories are shaded ██ blue. Kansas State victories shaded ██ purple.

All-time results
Kansas leads 204–95
Kansas leads in Lawrence 94–35
Kansas leads in Manhattan 81–49
Kansas leads in Kansas City, MO 27–11
Kansas leads on neutral courts 29–11
Largest K-State win: 27 points (96-69, on 1/20/1979)
Largest Kansas win: 45 points (90–45, on 3/10/1995)
Longest K-State streak: 5 (72–74, 82–83) 
Longest Kansas streak: 31 games (1994–2005)

Notes: Only on two occasions have KU and KSU met in a location other than Lawrence, Manhattan, or Kansas City. The first came in the 1988 NCAA Elite Eight when the teams played for a Final Four berth in Pontiac, MI; Kansas won a 71–58 decision over Kansas State in that contest, en route to the 1988 national title. The other such meeting came in the 2007 Big 12 Tournament semifinals in Oklahoma City; KU took a 67–61 decision over KSU en route to the Big 12 Tournament title for that year.

Key

References

College basketball rivalries in the United States
College sports in Kansas
Kansas State Wildcats men's basketball
Kansas Jayhawks men's basketball
1907 establishments in Kansas